Helen Walker McAndrew (6 February 1825, in Kirkintilloch, Scotland – 26 October 1906, in Ypsilanti, Michigan) was Washtenaw County's first documented female physician, and by many accounts, Michigan's first female physician.

Life 
Helen Walker was born in Kirkintilloch, Scotland to Thomas Walker and Margaret Boyd. In 1849 she married William McAndrew in Glasgow. The couple emigrated shortly after and arrived in Ypsilanti, Michigan, by way of New York.  On June 24, 1852, she gave birth to their first born son Thomas. On August 20, 1863, she gave birth to another son, William Jr. William Jr. would go on to become a noted educator.

Medical career 
In Ypsilanti, Helen practiced as a self-trained nurse. When her son was still an infant, she decided to pursue medicine. No medical school west of New York would admit McAndrew, so she traveled back east to attend the Trall Institute (New York Hydropathic and Physiological School), where she received her M.D. in 1855. When she returned to Ypsilanti she was ostracized by the public she had previously nursed. She turned to practicing medicine for the marginalized poor and African Americans in her community.  She was not accepted as a doctor until after she saved the life of local State Senator Samuel Post's long-suffering wife; after distinguished physicians from Ann Arbor could not help her. As a proponent of the water cure, she subsequently established a private practice with a sanatorium in her home and mineral baths in the nearby Huron River.

By numerous accounts, she was the first female physician in  all of Michigan.

Activism 
McAndrew was a leader of the push to admit women into the department of medicine at the University of Michigan, in which she succeeded in 1870. She, along with her husband, participated in the Underground Railroad, temperance societies and the suffrage movement in Washtenaw County. She worked with several prominent leaders on the suffrage movement including Elizabeth Cady Stanton and Susan B. Anthony.

Later life and death
McAndrew was widowed after the death of her husband on October 22, 1895. She died herself eleven years later on October 26, 1906.

Legacy 
In 1931, McAndrew was posthumously named Ypsilanti's "Most Distinguished Business and Professional Woman".

References

1826 births
1906 deaths
People from Kirkintilloch
People from Ypsilanti, Michigan
Scottish emigrants to the United States
19th-century American women physicians
19th-century American physicians
Washtenaw County, Michigan
Scottish suffragettes
Underground Railroad people